Klea Hamonikaj (born 28 May 2003) is an Albanian footballer who plays as a midfielder for Apolonia and the Albania national team.

International career
Hamonikaj made her debut for the Albania national team on 9 April 2021, coming on as a substitute for Sara Begallo against Bosnia and Herzegovina.

See also
List of Albania women's international footballers

References

2003 births
Living people
Women's association football midfielders
Albanian women's footballers
Albania women's international footballers
Sportspeople from Fier
FK Apolonia Fier (women) players